Aygyryal (Ayğıryal) is a rural locality (a village) in Yanybayevsky Selsoviet, Belokataysky District, Bashkortostan, Russia. The population was 188 as of 2010. There are 2 streets.

Geography 
Aygyryal is located 12 km west of Novobelokatay (the district's administrative centre) by road. Sokolki is the nearest rural locality.

References 

Rural localities in Belokataysky District